The Nacra 17 is a performance catamaran used for sailing. It was designed in 2011,  went into production in 2012 and has been the focus of multihull sailing at the Olympic Games since its conception.

The Nacra has been converted to a sailing hydrofoil for the 2020 Tokyo Olympics.

History
The Nacra 17 was specifically created to meet the criteria laid down for the new olympic discipline a first for Olympic sailing a mixed crewed boat. In May 2012 International Sailing Federation chose the Nacra 17 as the equipment for the mixed multi hull at the 2016 Olympic Sailing Regatta and 2020 Summer Olympics in Tokyo.

Morrelli & Melvin, the boat's designers, summed up the design philosophy with the following quote:

The ISAF Equipment Evaluation Panel wrote:

Events

Olympics

World Championship

See also
ISAF Sailing World Championships
World Sailing

References

External links
 Nacra 17 Class Association
 World Sailing Nacra Microsite
 Nacra Sailing

 
Catamarans
Olympic sailing classes
Classes of World Sailing
Sailboat type designs by Gino Morrelli
Sailboat type designs by Pete Melvin
Sailboat types built by Nacra Sailing